Strategic Rocket Forces may refer to:
 Strategic Rocket Forces, Russian strategic rocket forces
 Strategic Rocket Forces (North Korea), North Korean strategic rocket forces, known as Artillery Guidance Bureau

See also
 People's Liberation Army Rocket Force, China
 Rocket Forces and Artillery (Ukraine)
 Royal Saudi Strategic Missile Force